Stephen Adamini (born March 10, 1945) was a Democratic member of the Michigan House of Representatives from 2001 to 2006 representing a portion of the Upper Peninsula. On February 6, 2007, Governor Jennifer Granholm appointed Adamini to serve as a member of the Northern Michigan University Board of Trustees.

A practicing attorney since 1970, Adamini is the senior member of the law firm Kendricks, Bordeau, Adamini, Chilman & Greenlee, P.C. in Marquette. He served on the Michigan Transportation Commission from 1987 to 1991 and on the Michigan Law Revision Commission during his tenure in the House. Locally, he chaired the Marquette County Airport Board, served on the Alger-Marquette Community Mental Health Board, and served as the City Attorney for Marquette.

References

1945 births
Living people
People from Marquette, Michigan
Democratic Party members of the Michigan House of Representatives
University of Michigan Law School alumni
21st-century American politicians
Michigan lawyers
Place of birth missing (living people)